Andrew Pattulo (1850 – December 29, 1903) was an Ontario journalist and political figure. He represented Oxford North in the Legislative Assembly of Ontario as a Liberal member from 1896 to 1903.

He was born in Caledon Township, Canada West in 1850, the son of Scottish immigrants. He studied in Dundas and St. Catharines and at the University College in London, England. In 1889, he married Isabel Balmer. Pattulo was owner and editor of the Sentinel Review in Woodstock. He served as president of the Canadian Press Association. He was first elected to the provincial assembly in an 1896 by-election held after Oliver Mowat entered federal politics. Pattulo died in office in 1903.

External links
The Canadian parliamentary companion, 1897 JA Gemmill

1850 births
1903 deaths
Ontario Liberal Party MPPs
People from Woodstock, Ontario
Alumni of University College London